

External links 
Official Miss Venezuela website
Belleza Venezolana website
Miss Venezuela La Nueva Era MB

Editions
Venezuela-related lists
Lists of beauty pageants editions